Coccius is a surname. Notable people with the surname include: 

Ernst Adolf Coccius (1825–1890), German ophthalmologist 
Theodor Coccius (1824–1897), German pianist and pedagogue